Anthony Owura-Akuaku (born May 30, 1990), known by his stage name Nenebi, is a Ghanaian spoken word artist, poet, songwriter, performer, and storyteller. He began his entertainment career at the age of 11 when he started reading self-written poetry on Garden City Radio in Kumasi. In January 2013, Nenebi turned down his dream job as a columnist for Graphic Showbiz, Ghana's leading entertainment newspaper, to focus on his poetry and songwriting career.

Early life
Nenebi was born in Accra to Israel Akuaku and Ayishetu Amanor. His mom was 19 when she had him out of wedlock. He lived the first 7 years of his life in Ada, his hometown, before moving to Bolgatanga to live with his dad who was a police officer. He moved from Bolgatanga to Kumasi with his family two years after, when the police service transferred his das there. Nenebi had an abusive childhood. The abuses at home, coupled with the fact he didn’t fit in at school, always left him moody and suicidal. He had a suicide attempt at the age 16 when he was in secondary school.

Career

Early career
Nenebi started writing poetry when he was 9 and saw Maya Angelou on the national broadcast, Ghana Television, performing her popular poem, Phenomenal Woman. That sparked a desire in him to be a poet too. His teacher the following year, Mr. Thomas Assiedu, was a poet so became his first mentor. He started reading poetry every Saturday on Kumasi-based radio station, Garden City Radio, at the age of 11. He was on radio until he was 15 when he left Kumasi for the Kwahu Ridge where he had his secondary (senior high school) education at St. Peter’s Snr High School, Nkwatia-Kwahu. At Peter’s, his English teacher, Rev. Fr. Bernard, used to use his poems to teach the class literature instead of the G.E.S-prescribed poems. He also took money from his friends to write their letters for them. 
Nenebi moved to Accra in June 2008, a month after he left St. Peter’s to pursue his dream of becoming a writer. He worked with a human rights organization for a year before landing a job as a columnist and later reporter at the now folded-up local entertainment newspaper, Hi. He worked with his godfather, Verus Nartey, who was the Editor-in-Chief of the paper until 2012, when music video, marketing and television production company, Phamous Media Group, hired him as TV producer for their flagship program, Phamous TV. He left TV in February 2013 focus on poetry. His first show was at African Regent Hotel on February 14, 2013. He was an opening act for local singer-songwriter, Richie Mensah's This is Love Concert.

2014-present
Nenebi’s debut mixtape, A B.I.B.L.E of Things We Do, which is the first spoken word mixtape ever released in Ghana, was released on September 21, 2014. The 12-track-mixtape had a moderate hit in My Two Girlfriends. Nenebi’s debut album, See Me Naked, is scheduled for September 21, 2015. The first single, No Explanation was officially released on July 23, 2015, on YouTube with a video directed by local film director, Kobi Rana.

Artistry
Nenebi has created a unique style of music he calls Afropop Poetry. His style contains Western and African musical sounds to create the background for his recitals. Lyrically, his works are mostly themed around contemporary African living. He describes himself as "an African who has been damaged by modernity". He names Obour, Maya Angelou, Kanye West, Okomfour Kwaadee, K'naan, Daddy Lumba, Fela Kuti, Ayi Kwei Armah, showbiz columnist, Francis Doku, TV presenter Deloris Frimpong Manso (Delay) and Ghana's first president, Kwame Nkrumah as his biggest artistic influences. He is signed to Palm Wine Joint (N.dot.T), a label he started with financing from his mom.

References

Spoken word artists
1990 births
Living people